The shorthead snake eel (Ophichthus marginatus) is an eel in the family Ophichthidae (worm/snake eels). It was described by Wilhelm Peters in 1855, originally under the genus Ophiurus. It is a marine, tropical eel which is known from the western Indian Ocean, including Aldabra and Mozambique. Its range was once reported to include Knysna, South Africa, but the specimen on which this claim was based has disappeared.

References

Ophichthus
Fish described in 1855
Taxa named by Wilhelm Peters